Take Me Away is a 1994 Italian romance-drama film written and directed by Gianluca Maria Tavarelli, at his directorial debut.

Plot

Cast  
 
Stefania Orsola Garello as  Cinzia
 France Demoulin as  Cristina
 Michele Di Mauro as  Luigi
 Fabrizio Monetti as  Paolo
 Sergio Troiano as  Alberto

See also
 List of Italian films of 1994

References

External links

Italian romantic drama films
1994 romantic drama films
1994 directorial debut films
1994 films
1990s Italian-language films
1990s Italian films